E-mu Drumulator is a sample-based drum machine by E-mu Systems. Introduced in 1983 at a price of $995 USD, the Drumulator was the first programmable drum machine with built-in samples for under $1,000, resulting in sales of over 10,000 units over two years. The Drumulator was the predecessor of the E-mu SP-12.

The Drumulator utilizes 8-bit samples for 12 sounds, including SSM analog filters. It was widely used in early 1980s in synth-pop and Italo disco productions. In 1984, Digidrums released special EPROMs for the Drumulator, which included the Rock Drums set used on Tears for Fears' hit "Shout" and on "Beastie Groove" for Beastie Boys by Rick Rubin.

Notable users

References

External links
 http://www.vintagesynth.com/emu/drumulator.php
 http://www.retrothing.com/2010/05/remembering-the-emu-drumulator.html
 http://www.theemus.com/documentation/drumulator/Drumulator_Owners_Manual.pdf

Drum machines
Musical instruments invented in the 1980s